Lars-Göran Ivarsson (born October 21, 1963) is an ice hockey player who played for the Swedish national team. He won a bronze medal at the 1988 Winter Olympics. He played for Brynäs from 1984 until 1988, for HV71 from 1988 until 1993 and for Vasteras IK from 1978 until 1984, 1994-1997. And for KaiPa from 1997-98.

Career statistics

Regular season and playoffs

International

References 

1963 births
Living people
Ice hockey players at the 1988 Winter Olympics
Olympic bronze medalists for Sweden
Olympic ice hockey players of Sweden
Olympic medalists in ice hockey
Brynäs IF players
VIK Västerås HK players
HV71 players
Medalists at the 1988 Winter Olympics